Theodoros Papadopoulos (born 11 August 1987) is a Greek professional footballer who plays as a defender.

Career

His career began in 2006 when he signed a professional contract with Aris.

Last update: 30 June 2010

External links
 
Insports

Panthraxstats

1987 births
Living people
Greek footballers
Super League Greece players
Football League (Greece) players
Aris Thessaloniki F.C. players
Apollon Pontou FC players
Panthrakikos F.C. players
Anagennisi Giannitsa F.C. players
Diagoras F.C. players
Niki Volos F.C. players
Iraklis Psachna F.C. players
Association football defenders
Footballers from Thessaloniki